Frédérique Collin (born 1944 in Montreal, Quebec) is a Canadian actress, screenwriter and film director. She is most noted for her performance in Marie in the City (Marie s'en va-t'en ville), for which she received a Genie Award nomination for Best Actress at the 9th Genie Awards.

Her other acting credits have included the films Françoise Durocher, Waitress, Réjeanne Padovani, Once Upon a Time in the East (Il était une fois dans l'est), Gina, The Absence (L'Absence), Lucien Brouillard, To Be Sixteen (Avoir 16 ans), Lessons on Life (Trois pommes à côté du sommeil) and Au fil de l'eau, and the television series Témoignages and Fortier. Her stage roles included productions of Anne Legault's Conte d'hiver 70 and Michel Tremblay's High Mass for a Full Moon of Summer (Messe solonnelle pour une pleine lune d'été).

She was also co-director and co-writer with Paule Baillargeon of the 1980 film La cuisine rouge.

She dropped out of acting after 2003, reemerging in the early 2010s as a mental health and art therapy advocate after going public about her battles with alcoholism, drug addiction and compulsive gambling.

 List of roles 

 Cinema 

 1971 : Question de vie : Estelle 1972 : Françoise Durocher, Waitress - Françoise Durocher 1972 : The Time of the Hunt (Le Temps d'une chasse) : The young servant 1973 : La Conquête : Rita 1973 : Réjeanne Padovani : Hélène Caron 1973 : Les Allées de la terre : Zette 1973 : Noël et Juliette : rôle inconnu 1974 : Once Upon a Time in the East : Lise Paquette 1975 : Gina : Dolorès 1975 : The Yellow Island (L'Île jaune) : Suzanne 1975 : Confidences of the Night (L'Amour blessé) 1976 : The Absence (L'Absence) : Louise 1983 : Lucien Brouillard 1985 : Celui qui voit les heures : Mireille 1986 : Sonia : unnamed role 1987 : Marie in the City (Marie s'en va-t-en ville) 1988 : Lamento pour un homme de lettres : The wife of Laberge 1989 : Lessons on Life (Trois pommes à côté du sommeil) : Thérèse 2002 : Au fil de l'eau : Fabienne 2003 : Evil Words (Sur le seuil) : Madame Hénault Television 

 1971 : Fanfreluche (TV series) : Lucas (one episode) 1977 : Du tac au tac (TV series) : Hélène 1980 : Jeune Délinquant (miniseries) : Lawyer 1997 : Les Orphelins de Duplessis (miniseries) : Sœur Clothilde 2001 : Fortier (TV series) : Jeannine Doyle (two episodes) 2002 : Asbestos : Madame Duquette As director 

 1980 : La Cuisine rouge As writer 

 1980 : La Cuisine rouge Theatre 

 1971 : Les Belles-Sœurs by Michel Tremblay, directed by André Brassard - role of Lise Paquette, friend of Linda Lauzon
 1973 : Les Belles-Sœurs by Michel Tremblay, directed by André Brassard - role of Lise Paquette, friend of Linda Lauzon
 1974 : Les Belles-Sœurs'' by Michel Tremblay, directed by André Brassard - role of Marie-Ange Brouillette, neighbour of Germaine Lauzon

References

External links

1944 births
Canadian television actresses
Canadian film actresses
Canadian stage actresses
Actresses from Montreal
French Quebecers
Living people
20th-century Canadian actresses
21st-century Canadian actresses